Alexander Joseph Brunett (January 17, 1934 – January 31, 2020) was an American prelate of the Roman Catholic Church who served as archbishop of the Archdiocese of Seattle in Washington State from 1997 until his retirement in 2010. Brunett previously served as bishop of the Diocese of Helena in Montana from 1994 to 1997 and after his retirement he served as apostolic administrator of the Diocese of Oakland in California from 2012 to 2013.

Born and raised in Detroit, Michigan, Brunett was ordained to the priesthood in Rome in 1958. From 1959 to 1994 he held several church positions in the Detroit area. In April 1994 he was appointed bishop of Helena by Pope John Paul II and was consecrated bishop later that year. He was appointed archbishop of Seattle in October 1997, and held that office until he reached his mandatory retirement age in 2010. In 2012, Brunett was appointed as apostolic administrator of the Diocese of Oakland and held that position until a permanent bishop was installed in 2013.

Biography

Early life 
The second of ten surviving children, Alexander Joseph Brunett was born in Detroit, Michigan, on January 17, 1934, to Raymond Henry and Cecilia Una Mary (née Gill) Brunett. His father was the first master plumber in the state of Michigan and completed his sixth grade education at St. Charles Grade School in Detroit. His mother was born in Detroit also, but her parents were born in Ireland.  His uncle Alexander was also a priest. Although four of his sisters entered the Dominican Order, three of them later left the order to pursue other careers.

As a child, Brunett sold copies of The Detroit Times. Entering Sacred Heart Major Seminary in 1946, he obtained a Bachelor of Arts degree and was valedictorian of his class. He was sent by Cardinal Edward Mooney in 1955 to study at the Pontifical Gregorian University in Rome, where he earned a Licentiate of Sacred Theology and a Bachelor of Sacred Theology degree.

Priesthood 
Brunett was ordained to the priesthood for the Archdiocese of Detroit by Archbishop Luigi Traglia on July 13, 1958. While in Rome, he was among those selected as an honor guard for the body of Pope Pius XII after his death later that same year.

Upon his return to Michigan, Brunett served as an associate pastor at St. Rose of Lima Parish in Detroit (1959–1961) and at St. Alphonsus Parish in Dearborn (1961–1962). Brunett, while serving at St. Rose, was instructed by Archbishop John Dearden to enroll at the University of Detroit; he later received a Master of Education degree with a thesis on his experience at St. Rose entitled, "A Catholic School in a Changing Neighborhood". 

From 1962 to 1964, Brunett served as a chaplain at the University of Michigan in Ann Arbor. He also became a chaplain at Eastern Michigan University in Ypsilanti, Michigan in 1968. Brunett earned a doctorate in theology from Marquette University in Milwaukee, Wisconsin. He did further post-graduate studies at the Tantur Ecumenical Institute for Theological Studies in Jerusalem, the Catholic Institute in Paris, and the Goethe Institute in Germany.

In 1969, Brunett started teaching sacramental theology and served as dean of St. John Provincial Seminary in Plymouth, Michigan. In 1973, he was named both director of the Division of Ecumenical and Interreligious Affairs for the archdiocese and pastor of St. Aidan Parish in Livonia, Michigan.  During this time, he served as president of the National Association of Diocesan Ecumenical Officers (1974–1981) as well. Brunett co-founded and served as president of the Ecumenical Institute for Jewish-Christian Studies. 

He was also honored by the American Jewish Committee and received the Leo Franklin Award in Human Relations from the Temple Beth El in Detroit in 1989 in "recognition of his efforts to combat anti-Semitism and to create a climate of mutual respect in Catholic-Jewish relations."Brunett was raised to the rank of Monsignor in 1990, and became pastor of the National Shrine of the Little Flower in Royal Oak in 1991.

Bishop of Helena 
On April 19, 1994, Brunett was appointed the eighth bishop of the Diocese of Helene by Pope John Paul II. He received his episcopal consecration on July 6 1993 from Archbishop William Levada, with Archbishops Elden Curtiss and Adam Maida serving as co-consecrators, in the Cathedral of Saint Helena.

Shortly after his arrival in Helena, Brunett began a series of tours of the diocese, attending welcoming ceremonies and visiting parishes. He regularly visited local Indian reservations, and was initiated into the Blackfeet tribe, receiving the name, "Holy Eagle Feather". He was elected chair of the United States Conference of Catholic Bishops' Committee on Ecumenical and Interreligious Affairs in 1996.

Archbishop of Seattle
Brunett was later named the fourth archbishop of the Archdiocese of Seattle on October 28, 1997. Succeeding the late Thomas Murphy, he was formally installed on December 18, 1997. He was presented with the pallium, a vestment worn by metropolitan bishops, by John Paul II on June 29, 1998.

Brunett was one of the Catholic delegates to the 1998 Lambeth Conference, and became a co-chair of the Anglican-Roman Catholic International Commission in 1999. His ecumenical activity has led him to meet such figures as Archbishop George Carey of Canterbury, Ecumenical Patriarch Bartholomew of Constantinople, and Archbishop Desmond Tutu. In 2006, in recognition of his work in ecumenical and interfaith dialogue, Brunett received an honorary doctorate from Gonzaga University.

During the Church's sexual abuse scandals, the Archdiocese of Seattle paid $31 million for settlements, counseling, and attorney fees for about 250 sex abuse victims between 1987 and 2007, but it did not file for bankruptcy. In regards to these cases, he has said, "It is certainly a terrible thing. It is an embarrassing thing for me personally."

Despite the economic recession, annual contributions from Catholics in Western Washington doubled during Brunett's tenure as archbishop, providing funding for the construction of St. Elizabeth Ann Seton Catholic High School, which opened in 2009 in Vancouver, Washington, and Pope John Paul II High School, which opened in 2010 in Lacey, Washington. He also helped launch the Fulcrum Foundation, which provides scholarships to poor families to send their children to Catholic schools and oversaw the $7 million purchase, renovation and expansion of the Palisades Retreat Center in Federal Way, Washington.

Retirement and legacy 
Upon reaching the mandatory retirement age of 75 on 17 January 2009, Brunett submitted his letter of resignation to Pope Benedict XVI, with a request to continue in office. His resignation was accepted by Pope Benedict on Thursday, September 16, 2010. He was succeeded as archbishop of Seattle by Bishop James Sartain.

Within the United States Conference of Catholic Bishops, he sat on the Subcommittee on Native American Catholics and the Board of Bishops for the Pontifical North American College. He was also a board member for St. Patrick Seminary, Mundelein Seminary, and Catholic Near East Welfare Association. He was a lifelong fan of the Detroit Lions.

Apostolic administrator
On September 21, 2012, the Vatican named Brunett the apostolic administrator of the Diocese of Oakland following Bishop Salvatore J. Cordileone's departure to become Archbishop of San Francisco. He served as interim ordinary for the diocese until the installation of Michael C. Barber on May 25, 2013.

Stroke
On September 12, 2013, Brunett suffered a major stroke, which put him in intensive care. After recovering from the stroke, Brunett remained actively involved in the archdiocese attending major archdiocesan events until he suffered a fall on April 26, 2019.

Alexander Brunett died in Seattle on January 31, 2020, at the age of 86.

See also
 

 Catholic Church hierarchy
 Catholic Church in the United States
 Historical list of the Catholic bishops of the United States
 List of Catholic bishops of the United States
 Lists of patriarchs, archbishops, and bishops

References

External links

Archdiocese of Seattle

Episcopal succession

1934 births
2020 deaths
Clergy from Detroit
Roman Catholic Archdiocese of Detroit
Roman Catholic bishops of Helena
20th-century Roman Catholic archbishops in the United States
21st-century Roman Catholic archbishops in the United States
University of Detroit Mercy alumni
Roman Catholic archbishops of Seattle
Religious leaders from Michigan
American people of Irish descent